'IROC VII was the seventh year of IROC competition, which took place in 1979 and 1980. The format carried over from IROC VI in that three qualifying races were held for participants from NASCAR, CART, and Road Racing (which primarily consisted of Formula One, SCCA, and IMSA). The top four finishers in these qualifying races then earned the chance to race in the two final races at Riverside International Raceway and Atlanta Motor Speedway. It used the Chevrolet Camaro in all races, and this was the final year for the series before it went on hiatus until 1984. Bobby Allison won the oval finale en route to the championship and $75,000 .

The final points standings were as follows:

Race results

Qualifying Races

NASCAR Qualifying Race, Michigan International Speedway

 Neil Bonnett
 Bobby Allison
 Darrell Waltrip
 Buddy Baker
 Cale Yarborough
 Benny Parsons
 Dale Earnhardt
 Donnie Allison

CART Qualifying Race, Michigan International Speedway

 Gordon Johncock
 Bobby Unser
 Rick Mears
 Johnny Rutherford
 Wally Dallenbach
 Mike Mosley
 Tom Sneva
 Danny Ongais

Road Racing Qualifying Race, Riverside International Raceway 

 Mario Andretti
 Peter Gregg
 Don Whittington
 Clay Regazzoni
 Alan Jones
 John Watson
 Keke Rosberg
 Emerson Fittipaldi

Final Races

Road Racing Final, Riverside International Raceway 

 Darrell Waltrip
 Bobby Allison
 Mario Andretti
 Rick Mears
 Gordon Johncock
 Johnny Rutherford
 Neil Bonnett
 Buddy Baker
 Bobby Unser
 Clay Regazzoni
 Peter Gregg
 Don Whittington

Oval Final, Atlanta Motor Speedway 
Darrell Waltrip started on the pole position, with Bobby Allison on the outside of the front row. As the field came across the start/finish line to complete lap 2, fourth place Mario Andretti triggered a huge pileup. Andretti clipped the back of Waltrip's car, who then collected Neil Bonnett into the outside wall. Andretti crashed to the inside wall, and a chain reaction wiped out almost the entire field. Leader Allison was ahead of the crash, and Rick Mears somehow escaped cleanly. Eight cars were involved, with seven too damaged to continue. After a 40 minute red flag, the race resumed with five cars left. On lap 41, Don Whittington got loose coming out of turn four and crashed on the mainstretch. It necessitated another red flag for cleanup.

Only three cars were left to race to the finish. Allison took the lead with two laps to go. Mears and Rutherford battled side-by-side for second, as Allison went on to win the race and clinch the title. Johncock was the only other car running, but 8 laps down due to damage sustained in the big crash. 

At the end of the race nine of the twelve cars suffered significant damage. With eight of them badly wrecked, and no contract to continue the series, IROC would go on hiatus until 1984. 

 Bobby Allison, 66 laps
 Rick Mears, 66 laps
 Johnny Rutherford, 66 laps
 Gordon Johncock, 58 laps
 Don Whittington, 41 laps (crash)
 Darrell Waltrip, 2 laps (crash) 
 Neil Bonnett, 2 laps (crash) 
 Mario Andretti, 2 laps (crash) 
 Buddy Baker, 2 laps (crash) 
 Bobby Unser, 2 laps (crash) 
 Peter Gregg, 2 laps (crash) 
 Clay Regazzoni, 2 laps (crash)

References

External links
IROC VII History - IROC Website

International Race of Champions